Kennedy Institute may refer to:
 Edward M. Kennedy Institute for the United States Senate, an educational institution and museum in Boston, Massachusetts
 Kennedy Institute of Ethics, an academic think tank at Georgetown University
 Kennedy Institute of Ethics Journal, an academic journal
 Kennedy Institute of Rheumatology, Oxford, UK
 Kennedy Collegiate Institute, a secondary school in Ontario, Canada
 John F. Kennedy School of Government, a public policy school at Harvard University

See also 
 Kennedy Krieger Institute